Penicillium meridianum is an anamorph species of the genus Penicillium.

References 

meridianum
Fungi described in 1968